Kulāmkātir̲u Nāvalar (19th century in Nagor, 1833 – 1908) was a Tamil poet. He was proficient in Tamil, Arabic and English. He wrote a wide range of literature, including poems, prose literature, three literary translations, two grammar books, and two other texts. His books were nationalized by the Tamil Nadu government in 2007. He composed many types of literature including Kappiyams, Kalambakams, Koivas, Anthadis, Malas, and text books. He was the first to bring the history of Nagor Nayak into a book (Kanjul Karamathu). One of his best students was Thiramalai Adigalar.

Early life 
Ghulam Kathiru was born in 1833 to the affluent Tamil Rowther family in Nagore. His father was Ayurveda Bhaskara Panditha Vappu Rowther. His ancestors came from Ramanathapuram district and settled in Nagore.

Works 

 Kansool Karamattu
 Nagore Puranam
 Maturaikkōvai
 Maturait Tamil̲c Caṅkattup pulavarār̲r̲uppaṭai
 Āripunāyaka vacan̲am
 Pulavaraatrupadai
 Arabic Tamil Dictionary
 Mustafa maalai
 Umar basha yuddha sarithiram, Reynolds tamilization
 Porundhaa ilakkanam

Sources 

 International Registration Number : 81-88023-10 .

References

External links 
 Tamilnadu. Books written by novelist Ghulam Khadiri on the web site 2012-07-05 at the Vandavali machine.
 Gulam Kadiu Navalar literature and poetry books Nāvalar, Kulāmkātir̲u 1833-1908

Tamil poets

1833 births

1908 deaths